Manly is both a surname and a given name. Notable people with the name include:

Surname:
 Alexander Manly (1866–1944), newspaper editor
 Charles Manly (1795–1871), US governor
 Charles M. Manly (1876–1927), aviation pioneer
 James Manly (born 1932), Canadian New Democratic MP
 John Matthews Manly (1865–1940), American professor of English literature 
 Matthias Evans Manly (1801–1881), American justice
 Paul Manly (born 1964), Canadian Green MP, son of Jim
 William L. Manly (1820–1903), 1849 California Gold Rush pioneer 

Given name:
Manly Barton (born 1949), American politician
Manly Palmer Hall (1901–1990), Canadian author and mystic
 Manly Miles (1826–1898), American zoologist and agriculturalist
 Manly Wade Wellman (1903–1986), American writer

Given names
Surnames
English-language surnames
Surnames of English origin
Surnames of British Isles origin